3724 Annenskij, provisional designation , is a stony Gefionian asteroid from the central regions of the asteroid belt, approximately  in diameter. It was discovered on 23 December 1979, by Soviet astronomer Lyudmila Zhuravleva at the Crimean Astrophysical Observatory in Nauchnij, on the Crimean peninsula. The S-type asteroid has a rotation period of 3.97 hours. It was named for Russian poet Innokenty Annensky.

Orbit and classification 

Annenskij is a member of the Gefion family, a large asteroid family in the intermediate asteroid belt, named after 1272 Gefion. It is also known as the Ceres or Minerva family.

It orbits the Sun in the central main-belt at a distance of 2.3–3.2 AU once every 4 years and 7 months (1,680 days; semi-major axis of 2.77 AU). Its orbit has an eccentricity of 0.16 and an inclination of 8° with respect to the ecliptic.

Physical characteristics 

Based on its classification into the Gefion family, Annenskij is a stony S-type asteroid.

Rotation period 

Two rotational lightcurves of Annenskij were obtained from photometric observations by Italian and French amateur astronomers Silvano Casulli, Laurent Bernasconi and Cyril Cavadore . Lightcurve analysis gave a rotation period of 3.969 and 3.974 hours with a brightness amplitude of 0.30 and 0.28 magnitude.

Diameter and albedo 

According to the surveys carried out by the Infrared Astronomical Satellite IRAS, the Japanese Akari satellite and the NEOWISE mission of NASA's Wide-field Infrared Survey Explorer, Annenskij measures between 12.09 and 15.386 kilometers in diameter and its surface has an albedo between 0.1744 and 0.235.

The Collaborative Asteroid Lightcurve Link derives an albedo of 0.2021 and a diameter of 14.15 kilometers based on an absolute magnitude of 11.6.

Naming 

This minor planet was named after Russian poet and writer Innokenty Annensky (1855–1909). The official naming citation was published by the Minor Planet Center on 4 June 1993 with a correction on Annensky's date of death published on 4 February 1996.

References

External links 
 Asteroid Lightcurve Database (LCDB), query form (info )
 Dictionary of Minor Planet Names, Google books
 Asteroids and comets rotation curves, CdR – Observatoire de Genève, Raoul Behrend
 Discovery Circumstances: Numbered Minor Planets (1)-(5000) – Minor Planet Center
 
 

003724
Discoveries by Lyudmila Zhuravleva
Named minor planets
19791223